Shu of Wey–Kang or Kang-shu of Wey, Shu Feng of Kang, also known as given name Feng (封), Temple name Liezu (烈祖) was a Zhou dynasty feudal lord and the founder of the state of Wey. He was the ninth son of Ji Chang. Feng was also the full-brother of King Wu of Zhou, Duke of Zhou, Shu Zhenduo of Cao and Gao the Duke of Bi.

Life 
Shu Feng was at first the lord of Kang (康). After Rebellion of the Three Guards, Shu Feng received the capital city of Shang dynasty Zhaoge as his fief. This event marked the beginning of Wey's history.

Before sending the royal uncle of Kang to Zhaoge, Duke of Zhou worried that the young brother of his might not be capable of handling a new environment. It is said that Duke of Zhou made three admonitions for Shu Feng to prevent him from any wrong-doing.

In 1931 CE, Shu Feng's bronze vessel Kang Hou Gui was unearthed. The vessel's inscription shows that Shu Feng was sent to Zhaoge with the purpose of pacifying the people of Shang after their defeated rebellion.

Shu Feng had a son named Mao (髦).

Legacy 

Shu Feng's state of Wey would outlive all other Chinese states during Zhou dynasty except Qin which unified China. Wey existed even after Qin's unification of the six major states.

Shu Feng's shrine was located in Qi county, Henan province. It is currently abandoned.

References 

Zhou dynasty nobility
Monarchs of Wey (state)
Founding monarchs